Balsa is a headland on the opposite side of the Amazon River from Manaus, Amazonas, Brazil. The AM-070 road bridge comes from Santo Agostinho to the headland. It has a dock and slipway that goes by the same name.

References 

Geography of Amazonas (Brazilian state)